Texanna is a census-designated place (CDP) in McIntosh County, Oklahoma, United States. The population was 2,083 at the 2000 census.

Established in District 12 of the old Indian Territory, its post office existed from June 27, 1888 until July 16, 1940. Texanna's population in the 1905 Territorial Census was 200. It is said to have been named for a settlement of Texas Cherokees. Residents of Texanna now have a Eufaula and Checotah postal address.

Geography
Texanna is located at  (35.350928, -95.532556).

Texanna lies roughly east-southeast of Henryetta, being south of Interstate 40, east of U.S. Route 69, and on Lake Eufaula.

Demographics

As of the census of 2000, there were 2,083 people, 928 households, and 668 families residing in the CDP. The population density was 52.2 people per square mile (20.1/km2). There were 1,763 housing units at an average density of 44.1/sq mi (17.0/km2). The racial makeup of the CDP was 82.14% White, 0.67% African American, 12.43% Native American, 0.10% Asian, 0.19% from other races, and 4.46% from two or more races. Hispanic or Latino of any race were 1.10% of the population.

There were 928 households, out of which 20.7% had children under the age of 18 living with them, 60.1% were married couples living together, 8.2% had a female householder with no husband present, and 28.0% were non-families. 25.5% of all households were made up of individuals, and 13.6% had someone living alone who was 65 years of age or older. The average household size was 2.24 and the average family size was 2.65.

In the CDP, the population was spread out, with 19.3% under the age of 18, 4.8% from 18 to 24, 20.4% from 25 to 44, 30.6% from 45 to 64, and 25.0% who were 65 years of age or older. The median age was 49 years. For every 100 females, there were 95.4 males. For every 100 females age 18 and over, there were 95.7 males.

The median income for a household in the CDP was $27,653, and the median income for a family was $31,314. Males had a median income of $30,494 versus $15,875 for females. The per capita income for the CDP was $17,433. About 11.4% of families and 14.5% of the population were below the poverty line, including 13.6% of those under age 18 and 13.9% of those age 65 or over.

References

Further reading
 Shirk, George H. Oklahoma Place Names. Norman: University of Oklahoma Press, 1987. .

Census-designated places in McIntosh County, Oklahoma
Census-designated places in Oklahoma